Jonas Slier (22 March 1886 in Amsterdam – 5 November 1942 in Auschwitz concentration camp) was a Dutch gymnast who competed in the 1908 Summer Olympics.

Jonas Slier  was part of the Dutch gymnastics team, which finished seventh in the team event. In the individual all-around competition he finished 96th. There is no evidence  that another Jonas Slier, the uncle of Philip Slier was the athlete mentioned above.

References

External links
 

1886 births
1942 deaths
Dutch male artistic gymnasts
Jewish Dutch sportspeople
Gymnasts at the 1908 Summer Olympics
Olympic gymnasts of the Netherlands
Gymnasts from Amsterdam
Dutch people who died in Auschwitz concentration camp
Dutch civilians killed in World War II
Dutch Jews who died in the Holocaust